Caesar Augustus Llewellyn Jenkyns (24 August 1866 – 23 July 1941) was a Welsh international footballer who played in the Football League for Small Heath, Woolwich Arsenal, Newton Heath and Walsall.

Playing career
Born in Builth Wells, Jenkyns played for a number of English clubs, as well as winning eight caps for Wales.

After playing for several amateur sides in the Birmingham area, Jenkyns joined Small Heath (later renamed Birmingham) in 1888, despite aggressive interest from Aston Villa, who were looking to poach players from Unity Gas and Aston Shakespeare, which Jenkyns even more aggressively rebuffed.  Jenkyns was at Small Heath as they first joined the Football Alliance in 1889 and then became founder members of the Football League Second Division in 1892. By now he had made his debut for Wales and was club captain; he skippered Small Heath to promotion to the First Division in 1894, beating Darwen 3–1 in a test match.

Known as one of the most rugged defenders of his era, he was sent off four times while playing for Small Heath and that at a time when such occurrences were extremely rare. His career at Small Heath ended in March 1895 when he was released after an incident at Derby where, after being ordered from the field, he attempted to assault two spectators. Jenkyns moved to London in April 1895, joining Woolwich Arsenal, who had joined the Second Division less than two years ago. He was immediately made Arsenal captain, and made his mark in Arsenal history by becoming the club's first ever international player, after winning a cap for Wales against Scotland on 21 March 1896.

Playing at centre-half (which in those days was a midfield position), Jenkyns scored six times in 27 matches for Arsenal and was regarded by the club as one of their star players. However, his stay at the Gunners did not last long; in the summer of 1896 he moved to Newton Heath (who later became Manchester United). Jenkyns made his debut for the club on 1 September 1896 against Gainsborough Trinity. He spent two seasons with the Manchester club, taking over as captain from James McNaught, helping them to runners-up position in the Second Division in 1897. In November 1897, he left the club for Walsall, where he spent five years before joining Coventry City.

After retirement, Jenkyns ran a public house in Moxley , The George Inn, before joining the police force.

Career statistics

International

Notes

References

1866 births
1941 deaths
Officers in English police forces
People from Builth Wells
Sportspeople from Powys
Welsh footballers
Wales international footballers
Association football defenders
Birmingham City F.C. players
Arsenal F.C. players
Manchester United F.C. players
Walsall F.C. players
Coventry City F.C. players
Football Alliance players
English Football League players
Publicans
Welsh police officers